Ermengarde of Anjou may refer to:

Ermengarde-Gerberga of Anjou, Duchess of Brittany, daughter of Geoffrey I, Count of Anjou, wife first of Conan I of Rennes; secondly of William II of Angoulême
Ermengarde of Anjou, Duchess of Burgundy (1018–1076), daughter of Count Fulk III, wife of Geoffrey, Count of Gâtinais and Robert I, Duke of Burgundy
Ermengarde de Bourbon-Dampierre (fl. 1070), Countess of Anjou, third wife of Fulk IV, Count of Anjou
Ermengarde of Anjou (d. 1146) (1068–1146), Duchess of Aquitaine and Brittany, daughter of Count Fulk IV, alleged wife of William IX, Duke of Aquitaine and Alan IV, Duke of Brittany
Ermengarde, Countess of Maine (1096-1126), Countess of Anjou, first wife of Fulk V